KTM Intercity are diesel-hauled intercity train services in Peninsular Malaysia, operated by Keretapi Tanah Melayu Berhad (KTMB). Services operate along the East Coast Line between Tumpat and Gemas and on towards JB Sentral on the West Coast Line. The former Intercity services along the West Coast Line between Padang Besar in the north (and subsequent services to Thailand) and Gemas have been converted to the KTM ETS service.

KTM Intercity has long enjoyed moderate success, but increasingly faces competition with road and air travel, as expressways (motorways) increase in number and budget airlines offer shorter travelling time. In 2006, KTM Intercity earned a profit of RM 70.94 million as group revenue, hovering around the RM 65 million mark since 2001.

KTM has announced that ticket sales for the ETS and KTM Intercity train services for 2022 will open on January 5.

Local and express services 
There are two types of KTM Intercity train services: Express and Shuttle. Long-distance passenger trains along the East Coast route (Tumpat - Gemas - Johor Bahru Sentral) are express trains calling only at major stations. The East Coast Line also still has mostly shuttle trains calling at all stations and halts.

Train classes 
Currently, there are only two classes available on KTM Intercity trains:

ASC: Air-conditioned Second Class (ASC) seat - A seating class consists of 60 seats, 30 forward, and 30 in the reverse direction in a 2+2 configuration. It is the most common class and is available on all KTM Intercity trains.

AFC: Air-conditioned First Class (AFC) seat - A seating class consists of 36 wide seats which can be roated to the direction of travel in a 2+1 configuration. It is available only on the Ekspres Rakyat Timuran and the seasonal Ekspres Khas Keluarga Malaysia.

ADNS: Air-conditioned Day-Night Second (ADNS) class sleeper - An open-plan sleeping berth coach with 40 berths, 20 lower berths and 20 upper berths. The ADNS is only available on the Ekspres Rakyat Timuran and seasonal trains Ekspres Khas Keluarga Malaysia and MySawadee.

Train services

Express Trains (limited stops – major cities and towns only)

Express train services typically consist of a locomotive, passenger cars and an AC car.

Express train schedule (terminals only)

Shuttle Trains (stopping at all stations and halts)

Shuttle trains typically consist of a locomotive, 4 passenger carriages and an AC car.

Shuttle Timur train schedule (terminals only)

Seasonal Trains (Express trains operating during festive seasons or school holidays)

Ekspres Khas Keluarga Malaysia (EKKM) - A seasonal train that operates during islamic festive seasons between KL Sentral and Tumpat few days before the Hari Raya Puasa/Haji and return from Tumpat to KL Sentral few days after. 

MySawadee - A seasonal train that operates during school holidays between KL Sentral and Hat Yai on a Friday and return from Hat Yai to KL Sentral on a Monday during school holiday season.

List of KTM Intercity stations 
Below is the list of KTM Intercity stations, green ticks are two-way trips available while red ticks are one-way stops available only.

West Coast Line
KTM Intercity services from Padang Besar to Gemas have been absorbed into KTM ETS. The diesel-hauled locomotives now only operate between Tumpat, Gemas and Johor Bahru. Stations in bold are stops of the current Southern Express route, and will be replaced with ETS trains once services commences in 2023.

East Coast Line

See also 
 Rail transport in Malaysia
 Trans-Asian Railway

References

Intercity